Sinamore is a Finnish gothic metal band from Hamina. Sinamore released their first album A New Day in January 2006. This was followed by a second album Seven Sins a Second the following year. This would be their final release before the band's break-up.

Current members 
Mikko Heikkilä - Vocals, guitar
Jarno Uski - Bass
Sami Hauru - Guitar
Miika Hostikka - Drums

Discography

Studio albums
A New Day (2006)
Seven Sins a Second (2007)

Demos 
Follow Into the Cry (2004)

Videos 
"Darkness of Day" (2006)
"Fallen" (2006)
"Better Alone" (2007)

External links 
 Official website
 Official MySpace.com
 Sinamore at Napalm Records

Videos 
"Darkness of Day" (2006) at Napalm Records (WMV)
"Fallen" (2006) at Napalm Records (WMV)

Finnish gothic metal musical groups